The Tschingellochtighorn is a mountain of the Bernese Alps, located south of Adelboden in the Bernese Oberland. It overlooks the Engstligenalp on its western side.

References

External links

 Tschingellochtighorn on Hikr

Mountains of the Alps
Mountains of Switzerland
Mountains of the canton of Bern
Two-thousanders of Switzerland